EVVK is a Finnish expression and a TV show.

Particularly in acronymic form, the expression is still fairly recent, and many Finns consider its use juvenile. The phrase originates from a comedy TV-series by the group Lapinlahden Linnut.

The TV show EVVK was shown on the relatively new TV channel SubTV at late night. It consisted mainly of various kinds of humour aimed at an adolescent or young adult audience. It gained some publicity in Finnish magazines by occasionally finishing off with a short scene of the Finnish model Jasmin Mäntylä lying nude on her bed, but tastefully obscured by the bedcovers.

Finnish language
Finnish comedy television series